= Mac Jee =

Brazilian defence company

- Company type: Private limited company
- Industry: Arms, Aerospace
- Founded: 2007; 19 years ago
- Headquarters: São José dos Campos, São Paulo, Brazil
- Key people: Alessandra Stefani (CEO)
- Products: Missiles, Armoured vehicles
- Number of employees: +500
- Website: macjee.com.br

Mac Jee is a Brazilian defence company that develops defense systems, missiles and armoured vehicles. The company has operations in Brazil and France, and employs nearly 500 people.
